Neoeulia is a genus of moths belonging to the family Tortricidae.

Species
Neoeulia dorsistriatana (Walsingham, 1884)

See also
List of Tortricidae genera

References

Further reading
  1986: Pan-Pacific Entomologist 62

External links
tortricidae.com

Euliini
Tortricidae genera